The Stratford Residences is an unfinished high-rise residential and commercial building that will rise in Makati, Philippines. It is being developed by Picar Development Inc. The development arm and real estate subsidiary of the AMA Group of Companies owned by Ambassador Amable R. Aguiluz V.

The building was originally meant to have 74 storeys, which would have made it the tallest residential building in the Philippines.  Construction of the half-completed building ground to a halt around 2016.  In 2022, plans were announced to downsize the building  and complete it by 2026.

History
On 15 June 2011, Picar Development announced its construction of a 74-storey residential condominium that will rise along Kalayaan Avenue in Makati Poblacion. According to its website, the condominium will have 1,136 fully furnished residential studio, two-bedroom, three-bedroom and penthouse units. The Stratford Residences takes inspiration from skyscrapers such as the Hearst Tower and Bank of America Tower (Manhattan), both in New York City. It was later on announced that Tower 3 will house the Swiss-operated Movenpick Hotel.

The Stratford Residences will serve as the "anchor structure to the mixed-use complex," The Picar Place. It will have retail stores and other commercial structures, such as Buddha Bar which opened in 2012. The condominium is located near the Ateneo Professional Schools and Power Plant Mall.

Architecture and design
The Stratford Residences was designed by Filipino architect Jose Pedro C. Recio of Rchitects, Inc.

But according to Aguiluz, its "folded facade is not just for aesthetics, it helps in capturing and maximizing the presence of natural and artificial light." The model units have been designed by Ivy and Cynthia Almario, and "feature neutral hints of steel gray, slate and white, the pad’s premium fixtures, structured proportions and minimalistic design elements convey a functional yet contemporary space..."

The building has also been designed to be able to withstand earthquakes.

The residents will have 24-hour concierge service, remote-controlled lighting system, Wi-Fi access on all floors, security control systems, as well as energy, ventilation and communication technology features.

The first three floors of the condominium will be allotted for commercial establishments. It will also have nine underground floors for its parking area, which will have the capacity of 700 cars.

In 2012, Picar Development broke ground for the Swiss hotel chain, Movenpick Hotels and Resorts. It will have 305 European-contemporary designed hotel rooms and 320 residential apartments.

As of September 2017, the building remains unfinished and there were no construction workers in the site.

Amenities
The Stratford Residences' amenities will include a fitness center, meditation garden, lanai, adult- and kiddie-sized swimming pools, a day care center for children and a play area.  The Stratford Residences will also have a music library, a private mini-theater, and a function room.

Reception
In 2009, BCI Asia awarded The Stratford Residences the Best Design award for its distinct curvilinear design.

See also
List of tallest buildings in the Philippines

References

External links
Official Website
Official Website of Picar Development Inc.

Skyscrapers in Makati
Residential skyscrapers in Metro Manila
Buildings and structures under construction in Metro Manila